Winchester is a city in and the county seat of Scott County, Illinois, United States. The population was 1,593 at the 2010 census. Winchester is part of the Jacksonville Micropolitan Statistical Area.

Geography
Winchester is located at  (39.630046, -90.455848).

Demographics

As of the census of 2000, there were 1,650 people, 727 households, and 460 families residing in the city. The racial makeup of the city was 99.88% White and 0.12% Native American. Hispanic or Latino of any race were 0.18% of the population.

There were 727 households, out of which 31.2% had children under the age of 18 living with them, 49.4% were married couples living together, 11.4% had a female householder with no husband present, and 36.6% were non-families. 34.1% of all households were made up of individuals, and 19.9% had someone living alone who was 65 years of age or older. The average household size was 2.27 and the average family size was 2.92.

In the city, the population was spread out, with 25.0% under the age of 18, 6.4% from 18 to 24, 25.5% from 25 to 44, 21.8% from 45 to 64, and 21.3% who were 65 years of age or older. The median age was 40 years. For every 100 females, there were 85.4 males. For every 100 females age 18 and over, there were 80.8 males.

The median income for a household in the city was $30,938, and the median income for a family was $40,592. Males had a median income of $31,410 versus $20,000 for females. The per capita income for the city was $17,354. About 6.8% of families and 10.4% of the population were below the poverty line, including 12.0% of those under age 18 and 7.4% of those age 65 or over.

Notable people 

 Greene Vardiman Black, the father of modern dentistry was born near Winchester. His descendants practiced medicine there through the 1960s.
 Stephen Douglas moved to Winchester when he was 20 years old in 1833 to teach school.  He had forty students who paid him $3 each per quarter.  Douglas taught himself the law after school and soon left Winchester to work as a lawyer.
 George O'Donnell, pitcher for the Pittsburgh Pirates; born in Winchester
 Clyde Summers, labor lawyer and law professor at the Yale Law School and University of Pennsylvania Law School, subject of In re Summers

Points of interest

References

Cities in Scott County, Illinois
Cities in Illinois
County seats in Illinois
Jacksonville, Illinois micropolitan area